Easy is a 2003 American independent romantic comedy film written and directed by Jane Weinstock and starring Marguerite Moreau, Brían F. O'Byrne and Naveen Andrews.  It is Weinstock's directorial debut.

Plot

Jamie Harris is a neurotic, bright 25 year-old with a career naming peculiar consumer products. Though she gives them their identities, she's rather confused about her own. After dating a string of jerks, she's bewildered about whom to trust or how to find true intimacy. When two seemingly honorable men orbit around her, Jamie must confront what she is most afraid of.

Cast
Marguerite Moreau as Jamie Harris
Vanessa Marano as young Jamie 
Brían F. O'Byrne as Mick McCabe
Naveen Andrews as John Kalicharan
Emily Deschanel as Laura Harris
Caroline Goodall as Sandy Clarke
D.B. Woodside as Martin Mars
 Lanette Ware as Tanya

Reception
The film has a 59% rating on Rotten Tomatoes.

References

External links
 
 

American independent films
American romantic comedy films
2003 directorial debut films
2003 films
2003 romantic comedy films
2000s English-language films
2000s American films